Malmuth is a Jewish surname meaning "teacher" in the Hebrew Language. It is a variant of the surname, Melamed, see the latter page for other variants. Malmuth is also an uncommon given name.

People with the surname include:

 Bruce Malmuth (1934–2005), American filmmaker, brother of Norman
 Mason Malmuth, American poker player and writer
 Norman Malmuth (1931–2007), American aeronautical engineer, brother of Bruce

Jewish surnames
Hebrew-language surnames